Indonesia first participated at the Olympic Games in 1952 and has sent athletes to compete in every Summer Olympic Games since then, except for 1964, due to controversy around the Games of the New Emerging Forces, and 1980, when they participated in the U.S.-led boycott of the 1980 Summer Olympics. Indonesia is yet to participate in the Winter Olympic Games.

The National Olympic Committee for Indonesia was created in 1946 and recognized in 1952.

As of 2020, Indonesian athletes have won a total of 37 medals, twenty-one in badminton, fifteen in weightlifting and one in archery. Among countries in Southeast Asia, Indonesia ranks first in terms of the number of overall medals (37), and second in the number of gold medals (8), only behind Thailand which has 10 gold medals.

Archers Lilies Handayani, Nurfitriyana Saiman and Kusuma Wardhani gained the republic's first-ever podium finish, a silver medal, in the women's team event at the 1988 Seoul Olympics. Future married couple Susi Susanti and Alan Budikusuma won the nation's first two gold medals in the badminton women's and men's singles events respectively at the 1992 Barcelona Olympics. Barcelona 1992 was also the only Games in which Indonesia won 2 gold medals. Since then, Indonesia has won a single gold medal at every subsequent Summer Olympics, all in badminton, except for the 2012 London Olympics.

The country's most recent gold medalists are Greysia Polii and Apriyani Rahayu, who won the women's doubles event of badminton. Their victory made Indonesia the second country after China to have won gold medals in all five disciplines of badminton at the Olympics. At 33 years and 356 days of age, Polii also became the oldest female badminton player to win an Olympic gold medal.

Medals

Medals by Summer Games

Medals by demonstration and exhibition events

Medals by sports

Medals of sports 
*Demonstration and exhibition sports are not included in this list

Medals of demonstration and exhibition sports 
*Only for demonstration and exhibition sports medalists

List of medalists 
 Medalist of Demonstration & Exhibition Sports

Medals by individual
According to official data of the International Olympic Committee. This is a list of people who have won two or more Olympic medals for Indonesia. 

People in bold are still active competitors
 Medalist of Demonstration & Exhibition Sports

Olympic participants

Summer Olympics

Flag bearers

Notes

See also
 Olympic Games
 Paralympic Games
 Indonesia at the Paralympics
 Indonesia at the Youth Olympics
 List of flag bearers for Indonesia at the Olympics
 :Category:Olympic competitors for Indonesia
 :Category:Paralympic competitors for Indonesia

References

External links